The World Council of Churches (WCC) is a worldwide Christian inter-church organization founded in 1948 to work for the cause of ecumenism. Its full members today include the Assyrian Church of the East, the Oriental Orthodox Churches, most jurisdictions of the Eastern Orthodox Church, the Old Catholic Church, the Lutheran churches, the Anglican Communion, the Mennonite churches, the Methodist churches, the Moravian Church, Mar Thoma Syrian Church and the Reformed churches, as well as the Baptist World Alliance and Pentecostal churches. Notably, the Catholic Church is not a full member, although it sends delegates to meetings who have observer status.

The WCC describes itself as "a worldwide fellowship of 349 global, regional and sub-regional, national and local churches seeking unity, a common witness and Christian service". It has no head office as such, but its administrative centre is at the Ecumenical Centre in Geneva, Switzerland. The organization's members include denominations which claim to collectively represent over 500 million people across the world in more than 110 countries.

Many regional affiliates of the World Council of Churches, such as the Middle East Council of Churches and National Council of Churches in Australia, work for the cause of Christian unity at the domestic level, with member denominations including the Oriental Orthodox Churches, Lutheran churches, Catholic Church, Eastern Orthodox churches, Methodist churches, Anglican Communion, Reformed churches, among others.

History
The Ecumenical Movement met with initial successes in the late 19th and early 20th centuries, including the Edinburgh Missionary Conference of 1910 (chaired by future WCC Honorary President John R. Mott). In 1920, the former Ecumenical Patriarch of the Eastern Orthodox Church, Germanus V of Constantinople, wrote a letter "addressed 'To all the Churches of Christ, wherever they may be', urging closer co-operation among separated Christians, and suggesting a 'League of Churches', parallel to the newly founded League of Nations". Church leaders agreed in 1937 to establish a World Council of Churches, based on a merger of the Faith and Order Movement (under Charles Brent of the Episcopal Church of the United States) and Life and Work Movement (under Nathan Söderblom of the Lutheran Church of Sweden) organisations.

Its official establishment was deferred with the outbreak of World War II until 23 August 1948. Delegates of 147 churches assembled in Amsterdam to merge the Faith and Order Movement and Life and Work Movement. This was consolidated by a second meeting at Lund in 1950, for which the British Methodist Robert Newton Flew edited an influential volume of studies, The Nature of the Church. Subsequent mergers were with the International Missionary Council in 1961 and the World Council of Christian Education, with its roots in the 18th century Sunday School movement, in 1971.

WCC member churches include the Assyrian Church of the East and the Oriental Orthodox Churches, almost all of the Eastern Orthodox Churches and Lutheran Churches; the Moravian Church; the Anglican Communion; some Old Catholic Churches; the Methodist churches; the Presbyterian and other Reformed churches, a sampling of united and independent churches, and some Baptist and Pentecostal churches.

Many churches who refused to join the WCC joined to form the World Evangelical Alliance.

Delegates sent from the member churches meet every seven or eight years in an Assembly, which elects a Central Committee that governs between Assemblies. A variety of other committees and commissions answer to the Central Committee and its staff. Assemblies have been held since 1948.

The "human rights abuses in communist countries evoked grave concern among the leaders of the World Council of Churches." However, historian Christopher Andrew claims that, during the Cold War, a number of important WCC representatives of the Orthodox Church in Eastern Europe had been working for the KGB, and that they influenced the policy of the WCC. From 1955 to 1958, Robert S. Bilheimer co-chaired a WCC international commission to prepare a document addressing the threat of nuclear warfare during the Cold War.

At the 1961 conference, a 32-year-old Russian Orthodox Bishop named Aleksey Ridiger was sent as delegate to the assembly, and then appointed to the WCC's central committee. He was later elected as Russian patriarch in 1990 as Alexei II.

The ninth assembly took place in Porto Alegre, Brazil in February 2006, under the theme "God, in your grace, transform the world". During the first Assemblies, theologians Vasileios Ioannidis and Amilkas Alivizatos contributed significantly to the debates that led to the drafting of the "Toronto Statement", a foundational document which facilitated Eastern Orthodox participation in the organization and today it constitutes its ecclesiological charter.

The 10th Assembly was held in Busan, Republic of Korea, from 30 October to 8 November 2013.

In 2013 Dr. Agnes Abuom of Nairobi, from the Anglican Church of Kenya, was elected as moderator of the Central Committee of the World Council of Churches; she is the first woman and the first African to hold this position.

Events and presidents

Assemblies
The World Council of Churches has held 10 Assemblies to date, starting with the founding assembly in 1948:
Amsterdam, Netherlands, 22 August – 4 September 1948
Evanston, Illinois, United States, 15–31 August 1954
New Delhi, India, 19 November – 5 December 1961
Uppsala, Sweden, 4–20 July 1968
Nairobi, Kenya, 23 November – 10 December 1975
Vancouver, British Columbia, Canada 24 July – 10 August 1983
Canberra, ACT, Australia, 7–21 February 1991
Harare, Zimbabwe, 3–14 December 1998
Porto Alegre, Rio Grande do Sul, Brazil, 14–23 February 2006
Busan, South Korea, 30 October – 8 November 2013
Karlsruhe, Germany, 31 August – 8 September 2022

Presidents 

Presidents elected at the 11th Assembly are:
 Africa: Rev. Dr. Rufus Okikiola Ositelu, (Church of the Lord (Aladura))
 Asia: Rev. Dr Henriette Hutabarat-Lebang (Gereja Toraja)  
 Europe: Rev. Dr. Susan Durber (United Reformed Church)
 Latin America and Caribbean: Rev. Philip Silvin Wright (Anglican Diocese of Belize, Church in the Province of the West Indies) 
 North America: Rev. Angelique Walker-Smith (National Baptist Convention USA)
 Pacific: Rev. François Pihaatae (Maòhi Protestant Church)
 Eastern Orthodox: H.E. Metropolitan Dr. Vasilios of Constantia – Ammochostos, Church of Cyprus
 Oriental Orthodox: H.H. Catholicos Aram I (Armenian Apostolic Church of Cilicia)

Former presidents of the World Council of Churches include:
 The Rev. Gloria Nohemy Ulloa Alvarado (Presbyterian Church in Colombia)
 Chang Sang (Presbyterian Church in the Republic of Korea)
 T. C. Chao, Chinese theologian
 John X of Antioch (Patriarch of the Greek Orthodox Church of Antioch)
 Karekin II (Catholicos of the Armenian Apostolic Church)
 Rev. Dr. S.A.E. Nababan, Indonesian theologian
 Rev. Martin Niemöller, the famous Protestant anti-Nazi theologian
 Mele'ana Puloka (Free Wesleyan Church of Tonga)
 Mary-Anne Plaatjies van Huffel (Uniting Reformed Church in Southern Africa)
 Archbishop Anders Wejryd (Church of Sweden)

General secretaries
Since the World Council of Churches was officially founded in 1948, the following men have served as general secretary:

Commissions and teams
There are two complementary approaches to ecumenism: dialogue and action. The Faith and Order Movement and Life and Work Movement represent these approaches. These approaches are reflected in the work of the WCC in its commissions, these being:
Echos- Commission on Youth (ages 18–30)
Commission of the Churches on Diakonia and Development
Commission on Education and Ecumenical Formation
Commission of the Churches on International Affairs
Commission on Justice, Peace and Creation
Commission on World Mission and Evangelism
Faith and Order Plenary Commission and the Faith and Order Standing Commission
Joint Consultative Group with Pentecostals
Joint Working Group WCC – Catholic Church (Vatican)
Reference Group on the Decade to Overcome Violence
Reference Group on Inter-Religious Relations
Special Commission on Orthodox Participation in the WCC

Diakonia and development and international relations commissions
The WCC acts through both its member churches and other religious and social organizations to coordinate ecumenical, evangelical, and social action.

Current WCC programs include a Decade to Overcome Violence, an international campaign to combat AIDS/HIV in Africa and the Justice, Peace and Creation initiative.

Faith and Order Commission

WCC's Faith and Order Commission has been successful in working toward consensus on Baptism, Eucharist, and Ministry, on the date of Easter, on the nature and purpose of the church (ecclesiology), and on ecumenical hermeneutics.

Texts
 Baptism, Eucharist and Ministry (Faith and Order Paper No. 111, the “Lima Text”; 1982)
 The Churchː Towards a Common Vision (Faith and Order Paper no. 214; 2013) after The Nature and Mission of the Church – A Stage on the Way to a Common Statement (Faith and Order Paper no. 198; 2005) and The Nature and Purpose of the Church (Faith and Order Paper no. 181; 1998)
 Towards a Common Date of Easter

Justice, Peace and Creation Commission
Justice, Peace and Creation has drawn many elements together with an environmental focus. Its mandate is:

Focal issues have been globalization and the emergence of new social movements (in terms of people bonding together in the struggle for justice, peace, and the protection of creation).

Attention has been given to issues around:
economy
environment
Indigenous Peoples
peace
people with disabilities
racism
women
youth

Relations with the Roman Catholic Church

The largest Christian body, the Roman Catholic Church, is not a member of the WCC, but has worked closely with the council for more than three decades and sends observers to all major WCC conferences as well as to its Central Committee meetings and the Assemblies (cf. Joint Working Group).

The Pontifical Council for Promoting Christian Unity also nominates 12 members to the WCC's Faith and Order Commission as full members. While not a member of the WCC, the Catholic Church is a member of some other ecumenical bodies at regional and national levels, for example, the National Council of Churches in Australia and the National Council of Christian Churches in Brazil (CONIC).

Pope Pius XI stated in 1928, that the only means by which the world Christian community was to return to faith, was to return to Roman Catholic worship. In this regard, the Papacy rejected, to a great extent, the idea of the participation of the Catholic Church within the World Council of Churches.

Pius XI stated that the ‘One true Church’ was that of the Roman Catholic denomination, and therefore there was the implication that the Catholic Church was not permitted at this stage to engage with other denominations, which the Papacy considered to be irrelevant. A similar policy was followed by his successor, Pope Pius XII; the Catholic Church, therefore, did not attend the 1948 meeting of the WCC, in addition to the idea that all members of the Church were barred from attending WCC conferences.

Pope John XXIII took a different stance however, and in 1958 he was elected as the head of the Catholic Church. Ecumenism was a new element of Catholic ideology which had been permitted, which was signified to a great extent, when John XXIII met with the then Archbishop of Canterbury, Geoffrey Fisher. This was the first meeting between an Archbishop of Canterbury, and the Pope in the Vatican for 600 years. John XXIII later developed the office of the Secretariat for Promoting Christian Unity; which symbolised a dramatic shift in support for the ecumenical movement, from the Catholic Church, led from the Vatican. 1961 saw Catholic members attend the Delhi conference of the WCC, which marked a significant shift in attitude toward the WCC from the Papacy. There was the idea in addition to this, that the Pope invited non-Catholics to attend the Vatican II Council. This new approach to inter-denominational relations was marked within the Unitatis Redintegratio decree.

This document marked several key reforms within the Catholic approach:

I.	‘Separated brethren’ was the new term for non-Catholics, as opposed to the previously used ‘heretics’ 

II.	Both Catholic and non-Catholic elements are held responsible for the schism between Catholicism and the Protestant movement 

III.	Non-Catholics are recognised to the contributions that they make to Christian belief overall 

Further reforms have been enacted with regard to the nature of the Catholic Church on the world stage, for instance the 1965 union with the Patriarch of Constantinople, whereby the 1054 schism was undermined. In addition to this, Michael Ramsay, the then Archbishop of Canterbury, received an episcopal ring in 1966; a mark of union which had not been seen since prior to the Reformation. Moreover, the Anglican, Roman Catholic International Committee was additionally established as a means of promoting communication and cohesion between the two denominations. This has since marked a new level of participation of the Catholic Faith in the aforementioned ecumenical movement, and therefore is the basis for increased participation from the faith, in the WCC.

Special Commission on Orthodox Participation in the WCC
A Special Commission was set up by the eighth Harare Assembly in December 1998 to address Orthodox concerns about WCC membership and the council's decision-making style, public statements, worship practices, and other issues. It issued its final report in 2006. Specific issues that it clarified were that the WCC does not formulate doctrine, does not have authority to rule on moral issues, nor does it have any ecclesiastical authority. Such authority is entirely internal to each individual member church. It proposed that the WCC adopt a consensus method of decision making. It proposed that Orthodox members be brought in parity with non-Orthodox members. It further proposed clarification that inter-confessional prayer at WCC events is not worship, particularly "it should avoid giving the impression of being the worship of a church", and confessional and inter-confessional prayer each be specifically identified as such at WCC events.

Peace journalism
The WCC is also a prominent supporter and practitioning body for Peace journalism: journalism practice that aims to avoid a value bias in favor of violence that often characterizes coverage of conflict.

Spin-offs and related organizations
The ACT Alliance, bringing together over 100 church-backed relief and development organizations worldwide, was born out of the merger of ACT International (Action by Churches Together International) and ACT Development (Action by Churches Together for Development) in March 2010. Both ACT International, established in 1995, and ACT Development (2007) were created through the leadership of the World Council of Churches (WCC). The two bodies coordinated the work of agencies related to the member churches of the WCC and the Lutheran World Federation in the areas of humanitarian emergencies and poverty reduction respectively.

The Ecumenical Advocacy Alliance was officially founded in December 2000 at a meeting convened by the WCC. There are currently 73 churches and Christian organizations that are members of the Alliance, from Catholic, Evangelical, Orthodox and Protestant traditions. These members, representing a combined constituency of tens of millions of people around the world, are committed to working together in public witness and action for justice on defined issues of common concern. Current campaigns are on Food and on HIV and AIDS.

The Ecumenical Church Loan Fund (ECLOF) was founded in 1946 as one of the world's first international micro-credit institutions in the service of the poor. Willem Visser 't Hooft, then general secretary of the "WCC in process of formation" played an important role in founding ECLOF. It was he who sketched the prospects and challenges for the proposed institution and gave specific ideas on potential sources of funds. His inspiration and teamwork marked the beginning of a long and fruitful cooperation between ECLOF and the WCC.

The Ecumenical Development Cooperative Society U.A (now known as Oikocredit) was developed from discussions at the 1968 Uppsala 4th Assembly, regarding church divestment from financial institutions supporting apartheid-era South Africa and the war in Vietnam. After several years of planning, the cooperative society was founded in 1975 in the Netherlands to provide an alternative ethical investment vehicle to church institutions, by providing credit to productive enterprises serving economically disadvantaged populations. Originally organized for large institutional members of the WCC, by 1976 local congregations developed Support Associations to enable congregations as well as individuals to participate. EDCS became independent from the WCC in 1977.

Ecumenical News International (ENI) was launched in 1994 as a global news service reporting on ecumenical developments and other news of the churches, and giving religious perspectives on news developments worldwide. The joint sponsors of ENI, which was based at the Ecumenical Centre in Geneva, Switzerland, are the World Council of Churches, the Lutheran World Federation, the World Alliance of Reformed Churches, and the Conference of European Churches, which also have their headquarters at the Ecumenical Centre. A shortage of funds led to the suspension of the work of ENI in 2012. As of 2015 ENI remains closed.

Regional/national councils
The WCC has not sought the organic union of different Christian denominations, but it has, however, facilitated dialogue and supported local, national, and regional dialogue and cooperation.

Membership in a regional or national council does not mean that the particular group is also a member of the WCC.
Africa – All Africa Conference of Churches
 Organization of African Instituted Churches
Asia (including Australia and New Zealand) – Christian Conference of Asia (CCA), Hong Kong
National Council of Churches in Australia
National Council of Churches in the Philippines
Caribbean – Caribbean Conference of Churches
Europe – Conference of European Churches, Geneva, Switzerland; Council of Christian Churches of an African Approach in Europe
Latin America – Latin American Council of Churches
Middle East – Middle East Council of Churches
North America
Canadian Council of Churches
National Council of the Churches of Christ in the USA
Pacific – Pacific Conference of Churches, Suva, Fiji

Criticism

Alleged neglect of suffering church in Eastern Europe

Some historians, the U.S. State Department and former KGB officers themselves have alleged and provided corroborating evidence that the KGB's influence directly, or through lobbying by means of a front organization, the Christian Peace Conference, resulted in the WCC's failure to recognize or act on calls for help from persecuted East European Christians at the 1983 Vancouver General Assembly.

Claims of infiltration and influence by the KGB
It is claimed the KGB has infiltrated and influenced past WCC councils and policy. In 1992, Father Gleb Yakunin, a vice Chairman of a Russian parliamentary commission that investigated the activities of the KGB, citing verbatim KGB reports, claimed that its Fifth Directorate was actively involved in influencing WCC policy from 1967 to 1989. For example, in the 1983 WCC General Assembly in Vancouver, one cited document described the presence and activities of 47 KGB agents to secure the election of an "acceptable" candidate as General Secretary. The Mitrokhin Archive reveals more about the depth of the penetration and influence wielded by the KGB over the WCC. Metropolitan Nikidim was a KGB agent, codenamed ADAMANT, who served as one of six WCC Presidents from 1975 until his death. His earlier intervention had resulted in the WCC making no comment on the invasion of Czechoslovakia. As a result of his influence and that of other agents, it is claimed the USSR was rarely publicly criticised. In 1989, copies of the KGB documents claim "the WCC executive and central committee adopted public statements (eight) and messages (three)" which corresponded to its own political direction. Appeals from suffering dissidents both from within the Russian Orthodox Church and Protestants were ignored in 1983.  Metropolitan Aleksi Ridiger of Tallinn and Estonia was repeatedly alleged to be a KGB agent codenamed DROZDOV, who in 1988 was awarded an honorary citation for services to the KGB by its chairman. Despite official disavowals, The Guardian described the evidence as "compelling".  In 1990 he became Alexius II, the 15th Patriarch of the Russian Orthodox Church. Upon his death in 2008, the WCC's official tribute, by its Council officers, described him as "courageous", "supportive and constructive" and the recipient of "abundant blessing", no reference was made to the allegations.

Attitude towards Israel
The World Council of Churches has been described as taking an adversarial position toward the state of Israel. It has also been claimed the council has focused particularly on activities and publications criticizing Israel in comparison with other human rights issues. It is similarly claimed that it downplayed appeals from Egyptian Copts about human rights abuses under Sadat and Mubarak, in order to focus on its neighbour. In 2009, the Council called for an international boycott on goods produced in Israeli settlements, which it described as 'illegal, unjust' and 'incompatible with peace'. In 2013, the General Secretary was reported to claim in Cairo, "We support the Palestinians. The WCC supports the Palestinians, because they are in the right." The WCC's Ecumenical Accompaniment Programme in Palestine and Israel (EAPPI) has been criticised by the Board of Deputies of British Jews for promoting "an inflammatory and partisan programme at the expense of its interfaith relations". The WCC secretariat was involved in preparing and helped disseminate the  Kairos Palestine Document, which declares “the Israeli occupation of Palestinian land is a sin against God and humanity because it deprives the Palestinians of their basic human rights”, and in the view of one critic, its "authors want to see a single state".
On the other hand, the WCC claims "Antisemitism is sin against God and man".

Opposition to Christian Zionism 
Christian Zionism, which has long represented a major thread of historic and contemporary Protestants, is characterised as a view which "distort(s) the interpretation of the Word of God" and "damage(s) intra-Christian relations".

Frank Chikane, moderator of the Commission of the Churches on International Affairs (CCIA) of the World Council of Churches (WCC), was criticised for using the term 'demons' to describe advocacy for Zionism in 2021.

On Monday, January 4, 2023, World Council of Churches general secretary Rev. Prof. Dr. Jerry Pillay joined the Episcopal Diocese of Jerusalem and all the churches of the Holy Land in condemning the desecration of the historic Protestant cemetery on Mount Zion.

See also

Lima Liturgy
Heresy
John R. Mott
John Romanides
Joseph Oldham
Nathan Soderblom
Charles Henry Brent
Christian ecumenism
Ecumenical Association of Third World Theologians
World Summit of Religious Leaders
Programme to Combat Racism
Authorship of the Bible
List of the largest Protestant bodies
Jennifer Marianne Hart

References

Citations

Sources 

 World Council of Churches. Members by country and by church   Retrieved 2010-03-31.

Further reading 
 W. A. Visser 't Hooft, The Genesis of the World Council of Churches, in: A History of The Ecumenical Movement 1517–1948, R. Rose, S. Ch. Neill (ed.), London: SPCK 1967, second edition with revised bibliography, pp. 697–724.

External links
 

 
Christian organizations established in 1948
Christian organizations based in Europe
Organisations based in Geneva
World Christianity
Church of Scotland
International Campaign to Abolish Nuclear Weapons